William Richard Dunn (7 February 1915 – 1 November 1997) was an Australian rules footballer who played with North Melbourne in the Victorian Football League (VFL).

He later served in the Australian Army in World War II.

Notes

External links 

1915 births
1997 deaths
Australian rules footballers from Victoria (Australia)
North Melbourne Football Club players